

J

Jikkoku Cable Line (Izuhakone Railway)
Jimbō Line (Group name. Composed of Kōbe Line and Takarazuka Line. Hankyu Corporation)
Jōban Line (East Japan Railway Company)
Jōetsu Line (East Japan Railway Company)
Jōetsu Shinkansen (East Japan Railway Company)
Jōhana Line (West Japan Railway Company)
Jōhoku Line (Central Japan Railway Company (tracks and services), Tokai Transport Service Company (services))
Jōhoku Line (Iyo Railway)
Jōmō Line (Jomo Electric Railway)
Jōnan Line (Iyo Railway)
Jōshin Line (Joshin Dentetsu)
Joso Line (Kanto Railway)
JR Kobe Line (Nickname. West Japan Railway Company) 
JR Kyoto Line (Nickname. West Japan Railway Company) 
JR Takarazuka Line (Nickname. West Japan Railway Company) 
JR Tōzai Line (West Japan Railway Company) 
JR Yumesaki Line (Nickname. West Japan Railway Company) 
Jukkokutoge Cable Car (Common name Izuhakone Railway)

K

Kabe Line (West Japan Railway Company)
Kada Line (Nankai Electric Railway)
Kagoshima Main Line (Kyushu Railway Company)
Kaigan Line (Kobe Municipal Transportation Bureau)
Kaikyō Line (Hokkaido Railway Company)
Kaizuka Line (Nishi-Nippon Railroad)
Kakamigahara Line (Nagoya Railroad)
Kakogawa Line (West Japan Railway Company)
Kamaishi Line (East Japan Railway Company)
Kameido Line (Tobu Railway)
Kamidaki Line (Toyama Chiho Railway)
Kamiiida Line (Common name. Transportation Bureau City of Nagoya)
Kamikōchi Line (Matsumoto Electric Railway)
Kamikumamoto Line (Kumamoto City Transportation Bureau)
Kanagawa Eastern Line (Sagami Railway, Tokyo Kyuko Electric Railway) Planned
Kanamachi Line (Keisei Electric Railway)
Kanazawa Seaside Line (Yokohama New Transit)
Kanden Tunnel Trolleybus (Common name. Kansai Electric Power Company)
Kansai Airport Line (Translation. West Japan Railway Company)
Kansai Kūkō Line (West Japan Railway Company)
Kansai Main Line (Central Japan Railway Company, West Japan Railway Company)
Karasuma Line (Kyoto Municipal Transportation Bureau)
Karasuyama Line (East Japan Railway Company)
Karatsu Line (Kyushu Railway Company)
Kasamatsu Cable (Common name. Tango Kairiku Kotsu)
Kashihara Line (Kintetsu Railway)
Kashii Line (Kyushu Railway Company)
Kashima Line (East Japan Railway Company)
Kashima Railway Line (Kashima Railway) Closed
Kashima Rinkō Line (Kashima Rinkai Railway)
Katamachi Line (West Japan Railway Company)
Katano Line (Keihan Electric Railway)
Katsuyama Eiheiji Line (Echizen Railway)
Kawagoe Line (East Japan Railway Company)
Kawaguchiko Line (Fuji Kyuko)
Kawasaki Longitudinal Rapid Railway (Kawasaki City Transportation Bureau) Planned
Kawasaki Municipal Subway (Common name. Kawasaki City Transportation Bureau) Planned
Keihan Main Line (Keihan Electric Railway)
Keihanna Line (Kintetsu Railway)
Keihin-Tōhoku Line (Common name. East Japan Railway Company)
Keikyū Main Line (Common name. Keihin Electric Express Railway)
Keikyu Zushi Line (Common name. Keihin Electric Express Railway)
Keiō Line (Keio Electric Railway)
Keiō New Line (Common name. Keio Electric Railway)
Keisei Main Line (Common name. Keisei Electric Railway)
Keishin Line (Keihan Electric Railway)
Keiyō Line (East Japan Railway Company)
Kengun Line (Kumamoto City Transportation Bureau)
Kesennuma Line (East Japan Railway Company)
Kibi Line (West Japan Railway Company)
Kikuchi Line (Kumamoto Electric Railway)
Kinokuni Line (Nickname. West Japan Railway Company)
Kintetsu Link Line (Sangi Railway)
Kinugawa Line (Tobu Railway)
Kiryū Line (Tobu Railway)
Kisei Main Line (Central Japan Railway Company, West Japan Railway Company)
Kishigawa Line (Wakayama Electric Railway)
Kishin Line (West Japan Railway Company)
Kishū Railway Line (Kishu Railway)
Kisuki Line (West Japan Railway Company)
Kita-Alps Line (Nickname. East Japan Railway Company, West Japan Railway Company)
Kita-Ayase Branch Line (Common name. Tokyo Metro)
Kita-Matsue Line (Ichibata Electric Railway)
Kitame Line (Common name. Shimabara Railway)
Kitakami Line (East Japan Railway Company)
Kitano Line (Keifuku Electric Railroad)
Kitaōji Line (Common name. Freight. Japan Freight Railway Company)
Kita-Riasu Line (Sanriku Railway)
Kitto Line (Kyushu Railway Company)
JR Kōbe Line (Nickname. West Japan Railway Company) 
Kōbe Main Line (Hankyu Corporation)
Kodomo-no-Kuni Line (Yokohama Minatomirai Railway Company (services), Tokyo Kyuko Electric Railway (tracks))
Kōen-Toshi Line (Kobe Electric Railway)
Koizumi Line (Tobu Railway)
Kokubunji Line (Seibu Railway)
Kokura Line (Kitakyushu Urban Monorail)
Kokusai Bunka Kōen Toshi Line (Osaka Rapid Railway)
Komaki Line (Nagoya Railroad)
Kominato Railway Line (Kominato Railway)
Kōnan Line (Konan Railway)
Kosaka Line (Freight. Kosaka Smelting & Refining)
Kosaka Railway Kosaka Line (Freight. Common name. Kosaka Smelting & Refining)
Kosei Line (West Japan Railway Company)
Kōtō Line (Freight. Mizushima Rinkai Railway)
Kotohira Line (Takamatsu-Kotohira Electric Railroad)
Kōtoku Line (Shikoku Railway Company)
Koumi Line (East Japan Railway Company)
Kōwa Line (Nagoya Railroad)
Kōya Line (Nankai Electric Railway)
Kōyō Line (Hankyu Corporation)
Kūkō Line (Fukuoka City Transportation Bureau)
Kūkō Line (Keihin Electric Express Railway)
Kūkō Line (Nickname. Kyushu Railway Company)
Kūkō Line (Nagoya Railroad)
Kūkō Line (Nankai Electric Railway)
Kurama Line (Eizan Electric Railway)
Kuramayama Cable Car (Kurama-dera Temple)
Kure Line (West Japan Railway Company)
Kureha Line (Toyama Chiho Railway)
Kurihama Line (Keihin Electric Express Railway)
Kurihara Den'en Railway Line (Kurihara Den'en Railway) Closed
Kurobe Cable Car (Common name. Tateyama Kurobe Kanko)
Kurobe Gorge Railway Main Line (Common name. Kurobe Gorge Railway)
Kururi Line (East Japan Railway Company)
Kusatsu Line (West Japan Railway Company)
Kuzuryū Line (Nickname. West Japan Railway Company)
Kyoto Line (Kintetsu Railway)
JR Kyōto Line (Nickname. West Japan Railway Company) 
Kyōto Main Line (Hankyu Corporation)
Kyūdai Main Line (Kyushu Railway Company)
Kyushu Shinkansen (Kyushu Railway Company)

L
Lines just with numbers, such as "Line 1", are listed separately.
Linimo (Nickname. Aichi Rapid Transit)

M

Main Line (Hakodate City Transportation Bureau)
Main Line (Hanshin Electric Railway)
Main Line (Hiroshima Electric Railway)
Main Line (Keihin Electric Express Railway)
Main Line (Keisei Electric Railway)
Main Line (Kurobe Gorge Railway)
Main Line (Nagasaki Electric Tramway)
Main Line (Ohmi Railway)
Main Line (Sagami Railway)
Main Line (Sanyo Electric Railway)
Main Line (Toyama Chiho Railway) (Railway)
Main Line (Toyama Chiho Railway) (Tramway)
Maizuru Line (West Japan Railway Company)
Man'yō Line (Nickname. Man'yo Line)
Marunouchi Branch Line (Tokyo Metro)
Marunouchi Line (Tokyo Metro)
Maya Cable Line (Kobe City Urban Development)
Meguro Line (Tokyo Kyuko Electric Railway)
Meijō Line (Common name. Transportation Bureau City of Nagoya)
Meikō Line (Common name. Transportation Bureau City of Nagoya)
Meishō Line (Central Japan Railway Company)
Metro Seven (Operator undecided) Planned
Midōsuji Line (Osaka Municipal Transportation Bureau)
Mikajiri Line (Freight. Chichibu Railway)
Mikawa Line (Nagoya Railroad)
Miki Line (Miki Rail-Bus)
Mikuni Awara Line (Echizen Railway)
Minami Line (Hiroshima Electric Railway)
Minami-Alpes Abt Line (Nickname. Oigawa Railway)
Minamime Line (Common name. Shimabara Railway)
Minami Osaka Line (Kintetsu Railway)
Minami-Riasu Line (Sanriku Railway)
Minato Line (Hitachinaka Kaihin Railway)
Minatomirai 21 Line (Yokohama Minatomirai Railway Company)
Minatomirai Line (Common name. Yokohama Minatomirai Railway Company)
Mine Line (West Japan Railway Company)
Minobu Line (Central Japan Railway Company)
Minoo Line (Hankyu Corporation)
Misumi Line (Kyushu Railway Company)
Mita Line (Tokyo Metropolitan Bureau of Transportation)
Mitake Tozan Cable (Common name. Mitake Tozan Railway)
Mito Line (East Japan Railway Company)
Miyafuku Line (Kyoto Tango Railway)
Miyajidake Line (Former name. Nishi-Nippon Railroad)
Miyajima Line (Hiroshima Electric Railway)
Miyazaki Kūkō Line (Kyushu Railway Company)
Miyazu Line (Kyoto Tango Railway)
Mizue Line (Freight. Kanagawa Rinkai Railway)
Mizuma Line (Mizuma Railway)
Mizushima Main Line (Mizushima Rinkai Railway)
Monkey Park Monorail Line (Nagoya Railroad)
Mooka Line (Mooka Railway)
Mori to Mizu to Roman no Tetsudō (The Railway of Forest, Water and Romance) (Nickname. East Japan Railway Company)
Motoyama Branch Line (Common name. West Japan Railway Company)
Mt. Tsukuba Cable Car Line (Tsukuba Kanko Railway)
Mugi Line (Shikoku Railway Company)
Mukogawa Line (Hanshin Electric Railway)
Muroran Main Line (Hokkaido Railway Company)
Musashino Line (East Japan Railway Company)
Myōken Cable (Common name. Nose Electric Railway)
Myōken Line (Nose Electric Railway)

N

Nagahori Tsurumi-Ryokuchi Line (Osaka Municipal Transportation Bureau)
Nagano Line (Kintetsu Railway)
Nagano Line (Nagano Electric Railway)
Nagano Shinkansen (Nickname. East Japan Railway Company)
Nagao Line (Takamatsu-Kotohira Electric Railroad)
Nagareyama Line (Ryutetsu)
Nagasaki Main Line (Kyushu Railway Company)
Nagoya Line (Kintetsu Railway)
Nagoya Main Line (Nagoya Railroad)
Nakamura Line (Tosa Kuroshio Railway)
Nakanoshima Line (Keihan Electric Railway) Under construction
Namba Line (Kintetsu Railway)
Namboku Line (Kobe Rapid Railway (services) )
Namboku Line (Sapporo City Transportation Bureau)
Namboku Line (Sendai City Transportation Bureau)
Namboku Line (Tokyo Metro)
Nambu Line (East Japan Railway Company)
Nambu Branch Line (Common name. East Japan Railway Company)
Nan Line (South Line) (Freight. Akita Rinkai Railway)
Nanakuma Line (Fukuoka City Transportation Bureau)
Nanao Line (Noto Railway)
Nanao Line (West Japan Railway Company)
Naniwasuji Line (Operator undecided) Planned
Nankai Main Line (Nankai Electric Railway)
Nankō Line (Freight. Nagoya Rinkai Railway)
Nankō Port Town Line (Osaka Municipal Transportation Bureau)
Nankō-Minato-Ku Link Line (New Tram Technoport Line) (Osaka Municipal Transportation Bureau)
Nankō-Minato-Ku Link Line (Technoport Line) (Osaka Municipal Transportation Bureau)
Nara Line (Kintetsu Railway)
Nara Line (West Japan Railway Company)
Narita Line (East Japan Railway Company)
Narita New Rapid Railway Line (Keisei Electric Railway (services), Narita Rapid Rail Access (tracks) ) 
Naruto Line (Shikoku Railway Company)
Negishi Line (East Japan Railway Company)
Nemuro Main Line (Hokkaido Railway Company)
New Shuttle (Nickname. Saitama New Urban Transit)
Nichinan Line (Kyushu Railway Company)
Nihonkai Jūkan Line (Group name. Composed of JR lines running on the Sea of Japan coast. East Japan Railway Company, West Japan Railway Company)
Nikkō Line (East Japan Railway Company)
Nikkō Line (Tobu Railway)
Nippō Main Line (Kyushu Railway Company)
Nippori-Toneri Liner (Tokyo Metropolitan Subway Construction Company (constructor), operated by TOEI.) 
Nishi-Futō Line (Freight. Mizushima Rinkai Railway)
Nishihino Line (Common name. Kintetsu Railway)
Nishikajima Line (Common name. Enshu Railway)
Nishikigawa Seiryū Line (Nishikigawa Railway)
Nishi-Kyūshū Line (Matsuura Railway)
Nishi-Nagoyakō Line (Nagoya Seaside Rapid Railway)
Nishio Line (Nagoya Railroad)
Nishi-Ōsaka Line (Hanshin Electric Railway)
Nishi-Shigi Cable Line (Kintetsu Railway)
Nissei Line (Nose Electric Railway)
Noda Line (Tobu Railway)
North Line (Translation. Freight. Akita Rinkai Railway)

O

Ōarai Kashima Line (Kashima Rinkai Railway)
Obama Line (West Japan Railway Company)
Odawara Line (Odakyu Electric Railway)
Ōedo Line (Tokyo Metropolitan Bureau of Transportation)
Ōfunato Line (East Japan Railway Company)
Oga Line (East Japan Railway Company)
Oga Namahage Line (Nickname. East Japan Railway Company)
Ogose Line (Tōbu Railway)
Ōigawa Main Line (Oigawa Railway)
Ōimachi Line (Tokyo Kyuko Electric Railway)
Ōito Line (East Japan Railway Company, West Japan Railway Company)
Ōkawa Branch Line (Common name. East Japan Railway Company)
Okinawa Urban Monorail Line (Okinawa Urban Monorail)
Oku-no-Hosomichi Mogamigawa Line (Nickname. East Japan Railway Company)
Oku-no-Hosomichi Yukemuri Line (Nickname. East Japan Railway Company)
Ōminato Line (East Japan Railway Company)
Ōmiya Line (Common name. Tobu Railway)
Ōmori Line (Hakodate City Transportation Bureau)
Ōmura Line (Kyushu Railway Company)
Onoda Line (West Japan Railway Company)
Osaka Line (Kintetsu Railway)
Ōsaka Higashi Line (West Japan Railway Company) 
Ōsaka Loop Line (West Japan Railway Company)
Ōsaka Monorail Line (Osaka Rapid Railway)
Oshiage Line (Keisei Electric Railway)
Ōta Line (Common name. Tobu Railway)
Ōtemachi Line (Iyo Railway)
Ōtō Line (Keihan Electric Railway)
Otokoyama Cable (Common name. Keihan Electric Railway)
Ōtsu Line (Group name. Composed of Keishin Line and Ishiyama Sakamoto Line. Keihan Electric Railway)
Ōtsuki Line (Fuji Kyuko)
Ōu Main Line (East Japan Railway Company)
Oume Line (East Japan Railway Company)
Ōura Branch Line (Nagasaki Electric Tramway)
Ōwani Line (Konan Railway)
Ōyama Cable Line (Oyama Kanko Electric Railway)

P
Peach Liner (Nickname. Tokadai New Transit) Closed
Phase 1 Line (Translation. Kagoshima City Transportation Bureau)
Phase 2 Line (Translation. Kagoshima City Transportation Bureau)
Port Island Line (Kobe New Transit)

List J